The Roland JX-1 is a music synthesizer produced by Roland Corporation. It was released in 1990. It is a PCM-sample-based keyboard.

Features

Connectors
 Left/Right Outputs
 Left/Right Inputs (Works as thru. The volume of the inputsignals can not be controlled by the volumcontroller)
 Phones (stereo)
 MIDI In, Out and Thru
 Pedal Hold
 AC Adaptor

Tones
 Preset: 64
 Memory: 32

Tone Parameters
 Cutoff
 Color
 Attack
 Release
 Vibrato Rate
 Vibrato Depth
 Reverb Level
 Reverb Time
 Reverb On/Off
 Chorus On/Off
 Octave Down On/Off

References 

JX-1